Malacca Islamic Museum is a museum about Islamic culture in Malacca City, Malacca, Malaysia. It exhibits various artifacts about the replica of early Quran manuscripts, history of mosques in the state, various religious figures from the state and Malaysia etc. The museum building used to house the Islamic Council of Malacca Office before it was shifted to its current location beside the State Mosque. Before the establishment of the Islamic museum, extensive renovations were done to create space for the museum.

See also
 List of museums in Malaysia
 List of tourist attractions in Malacca

References

2006 establishments in Malaysia
Buildings and structures in Malacca City
Islamic museums in Malaysia
Museums established in 2006
Museums in Malacca